Altschuler, Altshuler, Altschuller, Altshuller, Altschueler, Altshueler, or Alschuler is a Jewish surname of Ashkenazi origin. It is derived from the Altschul, Old Synagogue in Prague.

Alschuler is the surname of

 Alfred S. Alschuler (1876–1940), American architect
 George W. Alschuler (1864–1936), American politician and businessman
 Martin D. Altschuler (b. 1940), American astrophysicist
 Daniel R. Altschuler (b. 1944), Uruguayan physicist
 Samuel Alschuler (1859–1939), federal judge on the United States Court of Appeals 
 The Alschulers, an American political family

See also: 

Altschuler is the surname of

 Adi Altschuler (born 1986), Israeli educator
 David Altschuler (1687-1769), rabbi and Bible commentator
 Franz Altschuler (1923–2009), German artist and illustrator
 Glenn Altschuler, American writer and university-level educator and administrator
 John Altschuler (born 1963), American television and film producer and writer
 Modest Altschuler (1873–1963), Belarusian-American cellist, orchestral conductor, and composer
 Randy Altschuler (born 1970), American businessman and politician
 Samuel Altshuler (1864–1956) Washington state and California businessman
 Vladimir Altschuler (born 1946), Russian orchestral conductor 

See also: 

Altshuler is the surname of

 Alan Altshuler, American academic and government official, professor of urban policy and planning
 Boris Altshuler (born 1955), Russian-American physicist
Lev Altshuler (1913–2003), Russian physicist, father of Boris
 David Altshuler (curator), American Judaic scholar and museum curator
 David Altshuler (physician), American clinical endocrinologist and human geneticist
 Herbert Altshuler, American major general
 Lori L. Altshuler, American scientist
 Mor Altshuler, Israeli scholar
 Semen Altshuler (1911–1983), Soviet physicist

See also: 

Altshuller is the surname of

 Genrich Altshuller (1926–1998), Soviet engineer, inventor and scientist, journalist and writer

See also: 

Other variations of this name include Altschul or Altshul.

References

German-language surnames
Yiddish-language surnames